Kathrin Schmidt (born 12 March 1958 in Gotha, Bezirk Erfurt), is a German writer. She is known both for her poetry and prose.

Life and work 
Kathrin Schmidt grew up in Gotha and from 1964 in Waltershausen. After graduating from high school, she studied psychology at the University of Jena from 1976 to 1981. After completing her studies (diploma), she worked as a research assistant at the University of Leipzig from 1981 to 1982, and then as a child psychologist at the Rüdersdorf District Hospital and at the Berlin-Marzahn Child and Youth Health Protection Center.

In 1986/1987, she completed special studies at the Johannes R. Becher Institute of Literature in Leipzig. After the fall of the Berlin Wall, she worked at the Round Table in East Berlin. In 1990/1991 she was editor of the feminist women's magazine Ypsilon and worked as a research assistant at the Berlin Institute for Comparative Social Research until 1993. She has been a freelance writer since 1994. She is a member of the PEN Center Germany.

Kathrin Schmidt began writing as a teenager and initially published poetry. The poems are characterized by strict metre, powerful, sensual language and frequent use of puns. The novels, sometimes classified as magical realism due to the baroque fullness of the stories, also show Kathrin Schmidt as a powerful author with an exuberant imagination, who has been compared by critics to the early Günter Grass and Irmtraud Morgner.

To date, her greatest literary success is the autobiographically tinged novel Du stirbst nicht. In it, the author describes the illness and recovery story of the writer Helene, who is confronted with the lack of control over her body after a stroke and must relearn language. The book sold 150,000 copies and was awarded the German Book Prize in 2009.

Kathrin Schmidt raised five children with her husband and lives in Berlin-Mahlsdorf.

Selected works

Poetry books 

 Kathrin Schmidt. Poetry album (poetry series), 179th edition. Berlin 1982.
 An angel flies through the wallpaper factory. Neues Leben, Berlin 1987, .
 River Picture with Angel. Suhrkamp, Frankfurt am Main 1995, ISBN 3-518-11931-1; Lyrikedition 2000, Munich 2000, .
 Go-In the Belladonnas. Kiepenheuer & Witsch, Cologne 2000, .
 Dances of the Dead. With Karl-Georg Hirsch. Leipzig 2001.
 Blind Bees. Kiepenheuer & Witsch, Cologne 2010, .
 washing place of cool things. Kiepenheuer & Witsch, Cologne 2018, .
 sommerschaums ernte. Kiepenheuer & Witsch, Cologne 2020, .

Novels 

 The Gunnar Lennefsen Expedition. Kiepenheuer & Witsch, Cologne 1998, .
 Koenig's Children. Kiepenheuer & Witsch, Cologne 2002, .
 Seebach's Black Cats. Kiepenheuer & Witsch, Cologne 2005, .
 You Don't Die. Kiepenheuer & Witsch, Cologne 2009, .
 Kapok's Sisters. Kiepenheuer & Witsch, Cologne 2016, .

Tales 

 Sticky ends. Science fiction novella. Eichborn, Frankfurt am Main 2000, .
 Three carp blue. Short prose. Berliner Handpresse, Berlin 2000.
 Finito. Schwamm drüber. Short stories. Kiepenheuer & Witsch, Cologne 2011, .
 Tiefer Schafsee and other stories. With three color etchings by Madeleine Heublein. Leipzig Bibliophile Evening 2016.

Edition 

 Poetry Seminar 1989. 1990.
 Yearbook of Poetry 2011, with Christoph Buchwald. Deutsche Verlags-Anstalt, Munich 2011.

Awards 
 1988 Anna Seghers-Preis
 1993 Leonce-und-Lena-Preis
1994: Merano Poetry Prize
1994: Working scholarship of the German Literature Fund
1997: Town writer of Berlin-Hellersdorf
1998: Prize of the Province of Carinthia at the Ingeborg Bachmann Competition in Klagenfurt
1998: Working scholarship of the German Literature Fund
1998: Sponsorship award for the Heimito von Doderer Literature Prize
1998: GEDOK Literature Promotion Prize
2000: Working scholarship of the German Literature Fund
2001: German cultural prize
2003: Droste Prize of the city of Meersburg
2005: Art Prize for Literature of the Land Brandenburg Lotto
2009: Preis der SWR-Bestenliste
 2009 German Book Prize for Du stirbst nicht
 2017 Thüringer Literaturpreis

References 

1958 births
Living people
People from Gotha (town)
German women writers
Writers from Thuringia
German Book Prize winners